Extrasynaptic NMDA receptors are glutamate-gated neurotransmitter receptors that are localized to non-synaptic sites on the neuronal cell surface. In contrast to synaptic NMDA receptors that promote acquired neuroprotection and synaptic plasticity, extrasynaptic NMDA receptors are coupled to activation of death-signaling pathways. Extrasynaptic NMDA receptors are responsible for initiating excitotoxicity and have been implicated in the etiology of neurodegenerative diseases, including stroke, Huntington’s disease, Alzheimer’s disease, and amyotrophic lateral sclerosis (ALS).

Extrasynaptic NMDA receptors form a death signaling complex with the transient receptor potential cation channel subfamily M member 4 (TRPM4). The NMDAR/TRPM4 complex is considered central to glutamate excitotoxicity. NMDAR/TRPM4 interaction interface inhibitors (also known as 'interface inhibitors') disrupt the NMDAR/TRPM4 complex thereby detoxifying extrasynaptic NMDA receptors. In mouse disease models, interface inhibitors protect against stroke induced brain damage and retinal ganglion cell degeneration.

References 

Molecular neuroscience